Jeff Zywicki (born April 8, 1981) is a former professional lacrosse player from Ottawa, Ontario. He played college lacrosse at UMass. He was drafted 8th overall by the San Jose Stealth in the 2005 National Lacrosse League Entry Draft. He also played in Major League Lacrosse for the San Francisco Dragons, Denver Outlaws and the Toronto Nationals, who drafted him.

Early career
Zywicki grew up in Nepean, Ontario, Canada where he played his minor lacrosse. At 15, he led his Midget lacrosse team to a Provincial championship with his father, Eugene Zywicki as the head coach. At 16, Zywicki began playing for the Nepean Knights of the OLA Junior B Lacrosse League, where he finished second with 5.0 points per game to Andre Leduc (5.4 points per game) for most career points per game. In 1998, Zywicki had a career high 96 points and was awarded as the League's Most Outstanding Rookie. During his time with the Knights, Zywicki also split time playing with the Jr. ‘A’ Orillia Rama Kings.

College & professional career
Zywicki attended the University of Massachusetts Amherst where he was awarded ECAC Lacrosse League First Team honors as a senior.

That same year, Jeff was drafted 8th overall by the San Jose Stealth in the National Lacrosse League entry draft. He also plays for the Toronto Nationals of Major League Lacrosse. During the 2009 NLL season, he was named a reserve to the All-Star game.

International career
In 2006, Jeff lead the Canadian Men's lacrosse team to its first World Lacrosse Championship since 1978, when it defeated the U.S. 15–10 in the final of the 2006 World Lacrosse Championship. Jeff had an outstanding championship, being awarded the 'Best Attackman' and earning a spot on the All-World team after scoring a tournament record 28 goals in 8 games.

Statistics

NCAA

NLL

MLL

Junior

Senior

References

1981 births
Living people
Canadian expatriate lacrosse people in the United States
Canadian lacrosse players
Lacrosse forwards
Lacrosse people from Ontario
Major League Lacrosse players
National Lacrosse League All-Stars
San Jose Stealth players
Sportspeople from Ottawa
Hamilton Nationals players
UMass Minutemen lacrosse players
Washington Stealth players